William Lister may refer to:
William Lister (water polo), British water polo player
Bill Lister (1923–2009), American honky tonk country music singer
W. Lister Lister (1859–1943), Australian painter
William Lister (physician) (1756–1830), governor of St Thomas's Hospital in London
William Cunliffe Lister, British politician and barrister